Stade 81 (also known as Starting Blocks) is a 1981 documentary short film written and directed by Jaco Van Dormael. The short film was shot in 1981 in Sweden, Canada and United Kingdom. Stade 81 is a documentary about the first Special Olympics. The film received various awards, including the Caducee d'Or at the 1982 Rennes International Film Festival. In 2011, it appeared at the Sottodiciotto Filmfestival held in Turin in the retrospective dedicated to Van Dormael.

References

External links

1981 films
1981 short films
1980s short documentary films
Swedish short documentary films
1980s Swedish-language films
British short documentary films
Canadian short documentary films
Documentary films about the Olympics
Films directed by Jaco Van Dormael
Documentary films about sportspeople with disability
Special Olympics
British sports documentary films
1980s Canadian films
1980s British films
1980s Swedish films